

Countess of Neuchâtel

House of Hasenburg, 1034–1395

House of Freiburg, 1395–1457

House of Zähringen, 1457–1543

Princess of Neuchâtel

House of Orléans-Longueville, 1543–1707

House of Hohenzollern, 1707–1806

House of Berthier, 1806–1814

House of Hohenzollern, 1814–1857

See also
List of Prussian consorts
List of consorts of Brandenburg
Duchess of Longueville

 
Neuchatel